"Unga pojkar & äldre män" ("Young boys & older men") is a song by Swedish singer Lena Philipsson from her tenth studio album Jag ångrar ingenting (2005). Written by Orup and produced by Anders Hansson, the song was released as the album's lead single on 21 September 2005 through Columbia and Sony BMG. It peaked at number four on the Sverigetopplistan singles chart.

Track listing
CD single / digital download
"Unga pojkar & äldre män" – 3:58
"Unga pojkar & äldre män" (instrumental) – 4:31

Credits and personnel
Credits are adapted from the Jag ångrar ingenting liner notes.

Orup – music and lyrics
Anders Hansson – production, recording
Ronny Lahti – mixing
Björn Engelmann – mastering

Charts

Weekly charts

Year-end charts

Release history

References

2005 songs
2005 singles
Lena Philipsson songs
Songs written by Orup
Song recordings produced by Anders Hansson
Swedish-language songs
Columbia Records singles
Sony BMG singles